The National Rural Development Council (NRDC) is the federal component of the National Rural Development Partnership. The NRDC comprises representatives from various federal departments and national organizations whose activities or policies may affect rural areas. The NRDC provides guidance for the Partnership and works on behalf of State Rural Development Councils at the national level. Its administrative office is housed in the U.S. Department of Agriculture.

External links

Website

United States Department of Agriculture